Haddix Run is a stream in the U.S. state of West Virginia.

The stream most likely was named after the local Haddix family.

See also
List of rivers of West Virginia

References

Rivers of Tucker County, West Virginia
Rivers of West Virginia